The Juno Awards of 1984, representing Canadian music industry achievements of the previous year, were awarded on 5 December 1984 in Toronto at a ceremony hosted by Joe Flaherty and Andrea Martin of SCTV at Exhibition Place Automotive Building. The ceremonies were broadcast on CBC Television from 8pm Eastern Time.

1984 was a pioneering year for music video in Canada as MuchMusic began broadcasting in September, and a new Juno award for "Best Video" was presented for the first time.

As it had been 20 months since the last Juno show, a number of new artist nominees debuted this year including Corey Hart, Honeymoon Suite, Platinum Blonde, The Parachute Club and Zappacosta.

The Juno Award itself was revised from 18-inches high to a 15-inch statuette, retaining the metronome shape.

Awards ceremony
In October 1983, Juno organizers CARAS decided to move the awards date later in the year, tentatively to 3 December 1984 at Roy Thomson Hall in Toronto, Ontario. A stated reason for this move was to promote Canadian artists during the Christmas shopping season. CARAS also wanted to assume more control over the awards broadcast from CBC. Eventually, it was determined that CBC would continue to televise the Junos, but for 1984 would work with major music promoter Concert Productions International on the broadcast.

In August 1984, it was confirmed that the awards would take place at Exhibition Place two days later than planned. At the same time, a preliminary selection of "semi-finalist" artists and albums was also announced. The final set of nominations were determined in late October.

Bryan Adams was the heavy favorite of the evening with nominations in five categories of which he would take home four awards including "Male Vocalist of the Year" and "Album of the Year" for the hit Cuts Like a Knife album which had sold more than 3 million copies in the U.S. and over 300,000 copies in Canada. When Adams and his co-writing partner Jim Vallance won the "Composer of the Year" award, Adams excitedly accepted it on behalf of the absent Vallance: "This is the one I really wanted to win. Jim and I have been writing for six years together. Jimmy we did it! Right on!"

Performances during the show included the three "Canadian Music Hall of Fame" inductees: The Crew-Cuts, The Four Lads and The Diamonds, and also Jane Siberry.

The ratings for the television broadcast were far down from the previous year with an estimated 1,443,000 viewers.

Nominees and winners
This was the last year that the "Comedy Album of the Year" was awarded.

Bryan Adams was nominated twice in the same category for "Composer of the Year" award for two different songs both from the Cuts Like a Knife album.

The Good Brothers were given their final "Country Group of the Year" award after a record eight years in a row, while Loverboy claimed the "Group of the Year" award for the third year in a row, as did Liona Boyd for the "Instrumental Artist of the Year" award.

Director Rob Quartly received four of the five nominations for the nascent "Best Video" award category, and also took the win for the "Sunglasses at Night" music video.

Female Vocalist of the Year
Winner: Carole Pope

Other nominees:
 Dalbello
 Anne Murray
 Shari Ulrich
 Holly Woods

Male Vocalist of the Year
Winner: Bryan Adams

Other nominees:
 Bruce Cockburn
 Corey Hart
 Gordon Lightfoot
 Stan Rogers

Most Promising Female Vocalist of the Year
Winner: Sherry Kean

Other nominees:
 Véronique Béliveau
 Ann Mortifee
 Jane Siberry
 Diane Tell

Most Promising Male Vocalist of the Year
Winner: Zappacosta

Other nominees:
 LaBarge
 Johnnie Lovesin
 Nash the Slash
 Tim Ryan

Group of the Year
Winner: Loverboy

Other nominees:
 Chilliwack
 Payola$
 Red Rider
 Rush

Most Promising Group of the Year
Winner: The Parachute Club

Other nominees:
 Honeymoon Suite
 Men Without Hats
 The Nylons
 Platinum Blonde

Composer of the Year
Winner: Bryan Adams and Jim Vallance, "Cuts Like a Knife" by Bryan Adams

Other nominees:
 Bryan Adams and Eric Kagna, "Straight from the Heart"
 Billy Bryans, Laurie Conger, Lynne Fernie, Lorraine Segato, "Rise Up"
 Ivan Doroschuk, "Safety Dance"
 Corey Hart, "Sunglasses at Night"

Country Female Vocalist of the Year
Winner: Anne Murray

Other nominees:
 Carroll Baker
 Marie Bottrell
 Kelita Haverland
 Susan Jacks

Country Male Vocalist of the Year
Winner: Murray McLauchlan

Other nominees:
 Terry Carisse
 Dick Damron
 Ian Tyson
 Diamond Joe White

Country Group or Duo of the Year
Winner: The Good Brothers

Other nominees:
 Family Brown
 The Mercey Brothers
 Prairie Oyster
 Chris Whiteley and Caitlin Hanford

Instrumental Artist of the Year
Winner: Liona Boyd

Other nominees:
 Canadian Brass
 Hagood Hardy
 Frank Mills
 The Spitfire Band

Producer of the Year
Winner: Bryan Adams, Cuts Like a Knife by Bryan Adams

Other nominees:
 Kerry Crawford and Jon Goldsmith, Stealing Fire by Bruce Cockburn
 Dalbello, whomanfoursays by Dalbello
 Daniel Lanois, The Parachute Club by The Parachute Club
 David Tyson, Stand Back by The Arrows

Recording Engineer of the Year
Winner: John Naslen, Stealing Fire by Bruce Cockburn

Other nominees:
 Gary Gray, Weapons by Rough Trade
 John Naslen, No Borders Here by Jane Siberry
 John Naslen, On Purpose by Tim Ryan
 Lenny De Rose, whomanfoursays by Dalbello

Canadian Music Hall of Fame
Winner: The Crewcuts, The Diamonds, The Four Lads

Walt Grealis Special Achievement Award
Winner: J. Lyman Potts

Nominated and winning albums

Album of the Year
Winner: Cuts Like a Knife, Bryan Adams

Other nominees:
 Grace Under Pressure, Rush
 Hammer on a Drum, Payola$
 Keep It Up, Loverboy
 Neruda, Red Rider

Best Album Graphics
Winner: Dean Motter, Jeff Jackson and Deborah Samuel, Seamless by The Nylons

Other nominees:
 Heather Brown and Deborah Samuel, whomanfoursays by Dalbello
 Dean Motter, Visions of Our Future by The Tenants
 Dean Motter and Pat Harbron, Honeymoon Suite by Honeymoon Suite
 Bart Schoales, Stealing Fire by Bruce Cockburn

Best Children's Album
Winner: Rugrat Rock, The Rugrats

Other nominees:
 I Can Do Anything, Sphere Clown Band
 Music Builders, Music Builders
 Reflections on Crooked Walking, Ann Mortifee
 Special Delivery, Fred Penner

Best Classical Album of the Year
Winner: Brahms: Ballades Op. 10, Rhapsodies Op. 79, Glenn Gould

Other nominees:
 Andrew Davis Plays the Organ at Roy Thomson Hall, Andrew Davis
 Brass in Berlin, Canadian Brass
 Sibelius: Symphony #2, Toronto Symphony Orchestra with Andrew Davis
 Viola Nouveau, Rivka Golani-Erdesz

International Album of the Year
Winner: Synchronicity, The Police

Other nominees:
 Can't Slow Down, Lionel Richie
 Colour by Numbers, Culture Club
 Eliminator, ZZ Top
 Let's Dance, David Bowie

Best Jazz Album
Winner: All in Good Time, Rob McConnell & The Boss Brass

Other nominees:
 A New Look, Doug Hamilton and The Brass Connection
 Bye Bye Baby, Ed Bickert
 Indian Summer, Fraser MacPherson
 The Lion's Eyes, Steve Holt

Comedy Album of the Year
Winner: Strange Brew, Bob & Doug McKenzie

Other nominees:
 Air Farce Live, Royal Canadian Air Farce
 Go to Hell, Maclean and Maclean
 Laugh to Your Heart's Delight, Al Clouston

Nominated and winning releases

Single of the Year
Winner: "Rise Up", The Parachute Club

Other nominees:
 "Cuts Like a Knife", Bryan Adams
 "Safety Dance", Men Without Hats
 "Straight from the Heart", Bryan Adams
 "Sunglasses at Night", Corey Hart

International Single of the Year
Winner: "Billie Jean", Michael Jackson

Other nominees:
 "Every Breath You Take", The Police
 "Islands in the Stream", Kenny Rogers and Dolly Parton
 "Let's Dance", David Bowie
 "Girls Just Want to Have Fun", Cyndi Lauper

Best Video
Winner: Rob Quartly, "Sunglasses at Night" by Corey Hart

Other nominees:
 Robert Fresco, "Rise Up" by The Parachute Club
 Rob Quartly, "Doesn't Really Matter" by Platinum Blonde
 Rob Quartly, "Standing in the Dark" by Platinum Blonde
 Rob Quartly, "I Want You Back" by Sherry Kean

References

Bibliography
 Krewen, Nick. (2010). Music from far and wide: Celebrating 40 years of the Juno Awards. Key Porter Books Limited, Toronto.

External links
Juno Awards site

1984
1984 music awards
1984 in Canadian music